The FM- and TV-mast Zygry is a 346 metre tall guyed mast for FM and TV situated at Zygry in Poland.
The FM- and TV-mast Zygry is since the collapse of the Warsaw radio mast the third tallest structure in Poland.
FM- and TV-mast Zygry was built between 1970 and 1975.

Transmitted Programmes

TV-Programmes

Digital Television MPEG-4

See also
 List of masts

External links
 http://dtk.emitel.pl/obiekty/lodzzygry.html
 
 http://www.ukf.pl/index.php?topic=33.0
 http://www.skyscraperpage.com/diagrams/?b45466
 http://radiopolska.pl/wykaz/pokaz_lokalizacja.php?pid=3

Radio masts and towers in Poland
Poddębice County
Buildings and structures in Łódź Voivodeship
1975 establishments in Poland
Towers completed in 1975